The 1989 Atlanta mayoral election occurred on October 3, 1989. Former mayor Maynard Jackson won a third non-consecutive term in a landslide victory.

Incumbent mayor Andrew Young was barred from seeking reelection due to term limits.

Since Jackson received a majority in the general election, no runoff election needed to be held.

Candidates
Jerry Farber, comedian
Maynard Jackson, former mayor (1974–1982)
Lafayette Perry
Mark Teal
Hosea Williams, Atlanta city councilor
Mitchell Williams

Withdrew
Michael Lomax, chairman of the Fulton County Commission

Campaign
In early August, Jackson's prime competitor, Michael Lomax, withdrew from the race. Later that month, right before the qualifying deadline to enter the race, Hosea Williams entered the race, claiming that he wanted to prevent the election from becoming, "a coronation of Maynard".

The race drew little interest, and saw what was considered to be low turnout.

Results

References

1989 in Atlanta
1989 Georgia (U.S. state) elections
1989 United States mayoral elections
1989